Heatherton is a village located southwest of Stephenville. The population was 244 in 1951 and 290 in 1956.

The primary areas of employment are farming and fishing. Heatherton has one hardware store and one general store and two churches.

See also
 List of communities in Newfoundland and Labrador

Populated places in Newfoundland and Labrador